The word Tahor may refer to:

 the trade name of Atorvastatin
 "ritually clean" in Hebrew, as in tumah and taharah